Henry Taylor (born November 29, 1975) is a former American football defensive tackle. He was signed by the Detroit Lions as an undrafted free agent in 1998. He played college football at South Carolina.

Taylor also played for the Frankfurt Galaxy, Atlanta Falcons, Chicago Bears, Miami Dolphins, Dallas Desperados, New Orleans VooDoo, Nashville Kats, and Orlando Predators.

External links
https://en.m.wikipedia.org/wiki/1997_All-SEC_football_teamJust Sports Stats
New York Dragons bio
Miami Dolphins bio

1975 births
Living people
American football defensive tackles
American football defensive ends
South Carolina Gamecocks football players
Detroit Lions players
Frankfurt Galaxy players
Atlanta Falcons players
Chicago Bears players
Miami Dolphins players
Dallas Desperados players
New Orleans VooDoo players
Nashville Kats players
Orlando Predators players
New York Dragons players
Jacksonville Sharks players